The ICC Men's T20I Team of the Year is an honour awarded each year by the International Cricket Council. It recognizes the top men's cricket players from around the world in the Twenty20 International format of the game. The team does not actually compete, but exists solely as an honorary entity.

List

Winners 
Players marked bold won the ICC Men's T20I Cricketer of the Year in that respective year:

See also
 ICC Awards
 Sir Garfield Sobers Trophy (Men's Cricketer of the Year)
 ICC Men's Test Team of the Year
 ICC Men's Test Cricketer of the Year
 ICC Men's ODI Cricketer of the Year
 David Shepherd Trophy (Umpire of the Year)
 ICC Women's Cricketer of the Year
 ICC Women’s ODI Team of the Year
 ICC Women’s T20I Team of the Year

References

External links

International Cricket Council awards and rankings